Carl Maria von Weber's Piano Sonata No. 2 in A-flat major, Op. 39, is a piano sonata in four movements. Weber started his piano sonata in 1814 and completed it in 1816.

The sonata is in four movements:

The first movement's themes revolve around tremolos, arpeggiated chords and series of octave passages. The andante is calm and solemn at first, transitioning to a powerful middle section before returning to the style of the beginning. The third movement is titled Menuetto capriccioso, although it's tempo and character are much closer to that of a scherzo. The rondo concluding the sonata sparkles with joy and verve despite some rather trite thematic material.

Notes

External links 
 
 Piano Sonata No. 2 (Weber) played by Alfred Cortot
 Piano Sonata No. 2 (Weber) played by Dino Ciani

Piano sonatas
Compositions by Carl Maria von Weber
Compositions in A-flat major